Nav (also Romanized as Nāv; also known as Nov) is a village in Kharajgil Rural District, Asalem District, Talesh County, Gilan Province, Iran. At the 2006 census, its population was 162, in 31 families.

References 

Populated places in Talesh County